The  (originally , stylized as "HÜTTE" and pronounced ) is a reference work for engineers of various disciplines. The authors were members of the association. It is published in constantly revised editions to this day and is therefore the oldest German reference work still available today.

First edition 1857 and bibliophile reprint 2007 

For the 150th anniversary in 2007, the first edition was reissued as a bibliophile reprint.

Historical development 

Starting with the first edition in 1857, further book series have been developed over the decades. The reference work quickly developed into a standard work for engineers and was frequently reprinted and translated into other languages due to the great demand. The first translation ever was into Russian in 1863. In 1890, the work was divided into two, in 1908 into three, and finally in 1922 into four volumes. With the 27th edition in 1949, volume four was no longer available.

An English version was published by McGraw-Hill Book Co., New York, in 1916 as "Mechanical engineers' handbook, based on the Hütte and prepared by a staff of specialists" edited by Lionel Simeon Marks. This led to Marks' Standard Handbook for Mechanical Engineers, a work, which spawn several translations on its own and is continued up to the present with its 100th anniversary 12th edition published in 2017.

Another work initially influenced by the 1936 Russian translation of the 1931 edition of Hütte is the so called Bronshtein and Semendyayev (BS) handbook of mathematics. Written in 1939/1940 in Russia, it was first published in 1945. Translated into German in 1958, the latter is maintained and, in turn, translated into many other languages up to the present (2020).

Recent history 
In the first years after the Second World War the work was temporarily relocated both to the Federal Republic of Germany (FRG) and German Democratic Republic (GDR).

The scientific Springer-Verlag has been publishing the book since 16 June 1971 and has been the publisher of all  handbooks so far. For some time, the series was called "" (Technical Pocket Books). From the completely revised 29th edition in 1989 (volume editor ), the work once again appeared in one volume under the title "" (The Basics of Engineering). With the 32nd edition, it was renamed to the current title "" (Engineering Knowledge).

For the 150th anniversary in 2007, the 33rd edition of the book was published. It was updated to reflect the current state of science and technology and meet the curricula of technical universities and technical colleges. It comprises the following sections:

 Mathematical and scientific basics
 A. Math and statistics
 B. Physics
 C. Chemistry
 Technological basics
 D. Materials
 E. Engineering mechanics
 F. Technical thermodynamics
 G. Electrical engineering
 H. Measurement technology
 I. Regulation and control technology
 J. Computer engineering
 Basics for products and services
 K. Development and construction
 L. Production
 Economic and legal basics
 M. Business administration
 N. Management
 O. Standardization
 P. Legal
 Q. Patents

The 34th edition was published in 2012, and the 35th edition was planned for 2020 and is now scheduled to be released in 2023.

See also 
 Bronshtein and Semendyayev (BS)
 Marks' Standard Handbook for Mechanical Engineers

Notes

References

Further reading 
  (376 pages)

External links 
 Akademischer Verein Hütte e. V. Berlin 

Mechanical engineering
1857 non-fiction books
19th-century German literature
20th-century German literature
21st-century German literature
Handbooks and manuals